Anillidris is a genus of ants which only contains the species Anillidris bruchi. The genus is known only from a few collections in Brazil and Argentina. For a time Anillidris was synonymous with genus Linepithema, but was revived from synonymy by Shattuck (1992).

References

External links

Dolichoderinae
Monotypic ant genera
Hymenoptera of South America
Taxa named by Felix Santschi